Newton County is the name of six counties in the United States.  All except for Arkansas (and perhaps Mississippi) are named for Sgt. John Newton, a soldier of the American Revolutionary War who became a fictionalized hero. Many counties share a boundary with a Jasper County, named after Sgt. William Jasper, a similarly distinguished soldier.

The following counties are called Newton County:

Notes

Lists of counties of the United States
United States county name disambiguation pages